Naga Bhairavi is an Indian Telugu-language fantasy television series starring Pawon, Yashmi Gowda, Kalki Raja and Ashwini in lead roles. It started airing from 12 October 2020 and ended on 21 September 2021 on Zee Telugu and also available on ZEE5, even before TV telecast.

Plot 
Nagarjuna has recurring dreams about entering a prohibited area in a forest where he meets Bhairavi and gets chased by cobras. Bhairavi comes to India without her family knowledge and Bhairavi loses her sacred bangle, Nagarjuna finds it. Then they will come close then they will find their brother but their father will die.  .

Cast

Main 
 Pawon as Nagarjuna
 Yashmi Gowda as Bhairavi
 Kalki Raja as Nagulu
 Ashwini as Malli

Recurring 
 K. Sivasankar as Shivudu
 Rishi Gowd as Bujji
 Sarath as Jeevan Rao
 Vijay Ranga Raju as Maantrikudu
 Chinna as Veerabhadram
 Sravani as Saanvi
 Shruti as Kousalya
 Tanishka as Chinni
 Jackie as Krishnama Naidu
 Uma Reddy as Ambujam
 Varun as Satish
 Madhu Reddy as Viswambara
 Avinash as Sundaram
 Namrata as Sravani
 Swapna as Zareena
Priyanka Chowdary as Maya
Kaushik as Bhairavi's brother
Janaki Verma as Arjun's mother (present)
Vijaya as Arjun's mother (past)

Special appearances
 Ramya Krishna
 Bhavana as Soothsayer
 Prajwal as Lord Shiva
 Anusha Hegde as Goddess Parvati
 Sruthi Singampalli as Maantrikuralu
 Sreevani as Kamadhenu

Dubbed Version 
This serial dubbed in Kannada with the same title on Zee Kannada from 8 March 2021. The show is also dubbed in Malayalam as Nagadevatha on Zee Keralam from 19 September 2022.

Production 
This is a fantasy and super natural television show produced by Pawon and Kalki Raja under the banner team 27 pictures.

Title song 
The title song was written by Ramajogayya Sastry and composed by Gopi Sundar

References

External links 

 Naga Bhairavi on ZEE5

Zee Telugu original programming
Fantasy television series
Indian television soap operas
2020 Indian television series debuts
Indian fantasy television series
Telugu-language television shows
Indian supernatural television series